Werner-Jaeger-Halle  is a theatre in Nettetal, North Rhine-Westphalia, Germany.

Theatres in North Rhine-Westphalia